USS Autauga (AK-160) was an  commissioned by the US Navy for service in World War II. She was responsible for delivering troops, goods and equipment to locations in the war zone.

Service history
Autauga was laid down under a Maritime Commission contract, MC hull 2105, on 10 May 1944 at Richmond, California, by the Kaiser Cargo Co.; launched on 7 August 1944; sponsored by Mrs. Leroy Lloyd; delivered to the Navy at her builder's yard on 24 November 1944; and commissioned the same day. After conversion to a cargo ship at the Navy Dry docks, Terminal Island, California, between 6 December 1944 and 9 January 1945, Autauga conducted her shakedown training out of San Pedro, Los Angeles, from 10 to 22 January before shifting to Port Chicago, California early in February to load cargo. Autauga then departed San Francisco, California, on 16 February and, following a stop in the Marshalls, reached the Carolines one month later. After reporting to Commander, Service Squadron (ServRon) 10, at Ulithi as an ammunition issue and rework ship, she received from bulk carriers and then issued them to ships and craft that ranged from patrol boats to battleships.

Leaving Ulithi in her wake on 9 July, the cargo ship sailed for the Marshalls and reached Eniwetok on the 16th to resume operation as an ammunition issue and rework vessel of Service Division 102. After hostilities with Japan ended in mid-August, she sailed for the United States on 8 November, having serviced almost 400 ships. Autauga reached the Puget Sound Naval Shipyard on the 29th. Although initially earmarked for delivery to the War Shipping Administration (WSA) at Norfolk, Virginia, she was later directed to remain in the 13th Naval District because of the heavy workload at Norfolk. Decommissioned on 24 June 1946, Autauga was delivered to the WSA the next day, and her name was struck from the Navy List on 19 July 1946.

Acquired by the Koninklijke Nederlandsche Stoomboot Mattschappij, N.V. of Amsterdam, Holland, and renamed Hersilia, the former Navy cargo ship operated out of Amsterdam, under the Dutch flag, from 1949 to 1962. Subsequently, bought by the Saudi Arabian concern, the Saudi Lines, and renamed Fauzia B, she served until being scrapped in January 1971 at Hsinkang.

Notes

Bibliography

External links

Alamosa-class cargo ships
Autauga County, Alabama
Ships built in Richmond, California
1944 ships
World War II auxiliary ships of the United States